Peter Kiilu (died 19 May 2020) was a Kenyan politician. In the 2007 Kenyan parliamentary election, he was elected to the National Assembly of Kenya as a member of the Orange Democratic Movement-Kenya (later the Wiper Democratic Movement) representing the Makueni Constituency. In the 2013 Kenyan general election, he ran on the National Rainbow Coalition (NARC) ticket. Daniel K. Maanzo defeated him.

References 

2020 deaths
Year of birth missing
Orange Democratic Movement politicians
Members of the National Assembly (Kenya)